Ebba Hay (11 December 1866 – 26 May 1954) was a Swedish tennis player who competed in the 1912 Summer Olympics. She and her partner Frans Möller were eliminated in the first round of the indoor mixed doubles.

References

1866 births
1954 deaths
Swedish female tennis players
Olympic tennis players of Sweden
Tennis players at the 1912 Summer Olympics
People from Jönköping
Sportspeople from Jönköping County
20th-century Swedish women